Welty is a surname of Swiss-German origin. Notable people with the surname include:

Benjamin F. Welty (1870–1962), American politician from Ohio; U.S. representative 1917–21
Chris Welty (contemporary), American computer scientist
Eudora Welty (1909–2001), American author and photographer
Harry Welty (contemporary), American school board chairman in Duluth, Minnesota
John Welty (contemporary), American college administrator; president of California State University at Fresno since 1991
Rachel Perry Welty (born 1962), American photographer
Ron Welty (b. 1971), American punk-rock drummer

References

Swiss-German surnames